Prakash Amritraj and Philipp Oswald were the defending champions but chose not to compete.
Bradley Klahn and Michael Venus defeated second seeds Sanchai Ratiwatana and Sonchat Ratiwatana 7–5, 6–1.

Seeds

Draw

Draw

References
 Main Draw

Keio Challenger - Doubles
2013 Doubles
2013 Keio Challenger